Reforger '88 is a 1984 computer wargame designed by Gary Grigsby and published by Strategic Simulations. It takes place in a near-future setting and covers a hypothetical conflict between NATO and Warsaw Pact nations.

Gameplay
Reforger '88 is a computer wargame that simulates the hypothetical invasion of West Germany by the Warsaw Pact alliance, met with retaliation by NATO forces.

Development
Reforger '88 was designed by Gary Grigsby and released in 1984, the same year he launched Objective: Kursk and War in Russia. Reforger was built with the game engine and mechanics from Kursk.

Reception

Jasper Sylvester reviewed the game for Computer Gaming World, and stated that "Reforger '88 is an excellent game using a free-flowing and user-friendly system which is satisfying to play from the initial boot to the last turn of battle. It is the product of an incredible amount of research and even a perusal of the list of weapon systems makes some Pentagon budget considerations seem clearer."

In a 1985 survey of computer wargames for Current Notes, M. Evan Brooks called Reforger '88 a flawed title that "suffer[s] from the same defects as Objective: Kursk", although he considered it "somewhat more successful". In his similar 1989 survey, J. L. Miller of Computer Play called Reforger "somewhat dated" and offered it a middling score.

Reviews
Computer Gaming World - Jun, 1991

References

External links

Review in Family Computing
Article in Tilt (French)

1984 video games
Apple II games
Atari 8-bit family games
Cold War video games
Computer wargames
Strategic Simulations games
Turn-based strategy video games
Video games developed in the United States
Video games set in Germany